Two motor ships have borne the name Polarbjørn:

  is a 497-ton icebreaker completed on 18 January 1975, by Vaagen Verft, Kyrksæterøra, Norway. Sold in 1995 to Greenpeace, and renamed 
  is a 4,985-ton icebreaker launched on 21 July 2001. Chartered and renamed  in 2011; sold to the Royal Navy in 2013.

Ship names